Arshad Sayed is an Indian television and film writer. His first movie as director will be Satra Ko Shaadi Hai.

Filmography

Movies

Television

External links 
 

Indian male screenwriters
Year of birth missing (living people)
Living people
Hindi screenwriters
Indian television writers
Male television writers